USNS Sgt. Matej Kocak (T-AK-3005), (former SS Sgt. Matej Kocak (AK-3005)), is the lead ship of the  built in 1981. The ship is named after Sergeant Matej Kocak, an American Marine who was awarded the Medal of Honor during World War I.

Construction and commissioning 
The ship was built in 1981 at the Sun Shipbuilding, Chester, Pennsylvania. She was put into the service of Waterman Steamship Corp. as John B. Waterman.

In 1984, she was acquired and chartered by the Navy under a long-term contract. The ship underwent conversion at the National Steel and Shipbuilding, San Diego until October 1984. Later that year, put into service as SS Sgt. Matej Kocak (AK-3005). Sgt. Matej Kocak was put into the Maritime Prepositioning Ship Squadron 2, based at Diego Garcia in the Indian Ocean to support the US Marine Corps Expeditionary Brigade.

She was later transferred to the Military Sealift Command Surge Sealift as USNS Sgt. Matej Kocak (T-AK-3005) from 2 October 2012. At 11:30 a.m. of 22 January 2015, she ran aground approximately six nautical miles off the coast of Uruma, Okinawa. She was refloated on 3 February later that year.

Crowley Government Services Inc. was awarded $14,513,105 to maintain USNS LCPL Roy M. Wheat (T-AK-3016), USNS PFC Eugene A. Obregon (T-AK-3006), USNS Maj. Stephen W. Pless (T-AK-3007) and Sgt. Matej Kocak on 29 September 2020.

References

Sgt. Matej Kocak-class cargo ship
1981 ships
Ships built in Chester, Pennsylvania
Merchant ships of the United States
Cargo ships of the United States Navy
Container ships of the United States Navy